Gartside is a surname. Notable people with the surname include:

Surname
Anthony Edgar Gartside Wright or Antony Grey (1927–2010), English LGBT rights activist
Bob Gartside (1906–1970), English footballer
Charles Gartside (1887–1958), Australian politician
Green Gartside (born 1955), British musician, Scritti Politti
Henry Gartside Neville (1837–1910), English actor, dramatist, teacher and theatre manager
Jack Gartside, American fly tyer and fly fishing author
Mary Gartside (1781–1809), English water colourist and colour theorist
Phil Gartside (1952–2016), businessman and chairman of Bolton Wanderers Football Club

Middle name
Henry Gartside Neville (1837–1910), English actor, dramatist, teacher and theatre manager

See also
Gartside v Sheffield, a New Zealand legal case about liability for negligence cases against lawyers